Keelung Road (also called 14th Ave or Jilong Road, referring to Keelung) is a major arterial and highway in Taipei, Taiwan, connecting the Neihu district from the MacAuthur 1st Bridge in the east with the Songshan, Xinyi, and Daan districts towards the southwest, with a connection to Yonghe City via the Fuhe Bridge. Keelung is a very congested route because of its connections to and from Huandong Blvd., Tiding Blvd., Civic Blvd Expressway, Xinhai Road/National Freeway No. 3A, Shuiyuan Expressway, and the Fuhe Bridge, which are all major transportation corridors.  There are a series of reversible lanes and bypasses (above ground and underground) along the corridor to provide traffic relieve within the small right-of-way.

Landmarks  
Notable landmarks along Keelung Road include:
 National Taiwan University
 National Taiwan University Hospital Gongguan Branch
 Linjiang Street Night Market
 Taipei International Convention Center
 Taipei World Trade Center
 Taipei City Council

Sections 
Unlike most of Taipei arterials, Keelung Road is not divided into any directional sections.  However, there are still numbered sections of the road.
 Section 1 : MacAuthur 1st Bridge - Xinyi Road
 Section 2 : Xinyi Road - Dunhua S. Road
 Section 3 : Dunhua S. Road - Changxing Street
 Section 4 : Changhsing Street - Shuiyuan Expressway

Major Intersections 
 Tayou Road & Nanjing Road (surface road only)
 Tiding Blvd./MacAuthur 1st & 2nd bridges (highway only)
 Bade Road Sec. 4 & Civic Blvd Sec. 5 (surface road only)
 Civic Blvd Expressway (highway only)
 Yongji Road & Dongxing Road (surface road only)
 Songlong Road
 Zhongxiao East Road Sec. 4-5
 Shifu Road (southbound off-ramp and northbound on-ramp only)
 Songshou Road (diamond interchange)
 Xinyi Road Sec. 4-5
 Guangfu South Road
 Heping East Road Sec. 3
 Dunhua South Road Sec. 2 (surface road only)
 Xinhai Road Sec. 2-3 (surface road only)
 Roosevelt Road Sec. 4-5 (surface road only)
 Shuiyuan Expressway

See also
 List of roads in Taiwan

References

Streets in Taipei